Patricio Pasquel Quintana (born 16 March 1972) is a Mexican equestrian. He competed in the 2020 Summer Olympics in the team jumping event.

References

1972 births
Living people
Sportspeople from Mexico City
Equestrians at the 2020 Summer Olympics
Mexican male equestrians
Olympic equestrians of Mexico
Show jumping riders
Pan American Games medalists in equestrian
Pan American Games silver medalists for Mexico
Equestrians at the 2019 Pan American Games
Medalists at the 2019 Pan American Games